The 14th Slovenia Assault Division (Slovene: ,) was а Yugoslav Partisan division formed in Dolenjska on 13 July 1943. It was formed from the 1st and the 2nd Slovenia Brigades, and on 9 August the 3rd and the 7th Slovenia Brigades also became part of this division. Commander of the division was Mirko Bračič and its political commissar was Stane Dobovičnik Krt. In October 1943, it became a part of the 7th Corps. The division mostly operated in Slovenia.

References 

Divisions of the Yugoslav Partisans
Military units and formations established in 1943